Tynt Meadow is an English Trappist beer with an alcohol content of 7.4%. It is brewed at Mount St Bernard Abbey in Leicestershire.

Background 

On 6 March 2017, the Trappist Mount St Bernard Abbey near Coalville joined the International Trappist Association. A brewery was built in the abbey and on 9 July 2018 Tynt Meadow Trappist Ale was released to the market. 

On 17 September 2018, the beer received the Authentic Trappist Products label and became the twelfth official Trappist beer.

The beer is named after Tynt Meadow where the history of the abbey began in 1835. St Bernard could not be used as the name of the product due to the rights already being assigned to the Belgian St. Bernardus Brewery.

By July 2019, the abbey had produced approximately 30,000 bottles of Tynt Meadow and was struggling to satisfy demand. The beer was said to have become particularly popular in Belgium and the Netherlands. However, as the brewery must remain secondary in importance to the monastery's work and way of life, it was unlikely that demand would be satisfied.

The ale currently has an overall rating of 97 at the RateBeer website and a score of 99 in the context of the style.

References

External links 
 Official website for Tynt Meadow Ale

Trappist beer
Beer in England